Edward Beattie (born 4 February 1934) is a Canadian boxer. He competed in the men's lightweight event at the 1956 Summer Olympics.

References

1934 births
Living people
Lightweight boxers
Canadian male boxers
Olympic boxers of Canada
Boxers at the 1956 Summer Olympics
People from Kilsyth
Scottish emigrants to Canada